The Pegula Ice Arena is a 6,014-seat multi-purpose arena in University Park, Pennsylvania on the campus of Penn State University. The facility is located on the corner of Curtin Road and University Drive near the Bryce Jordan Center. The arena is named after Kim and Terry Pegula for their donations to fund the arena and it replaced the 1,350-seat Penn State Ice Pavilion.

The arena contains two ice surfaces. One, the Varsity Rink, is used for Penn State Hockey games and other main events. It has a capacity of 6,014. The other, the Community Rink, has a capacity of 300 and functions as a public ice rink for the community.

History
On September 17, 2010 it was officially announced the men's and women's ice hockey programs would move to the NCAA Division I level for the 2012-13 season. The teams competed in the existing 1,350-seat Penn State Ice Pavilion until the new arena was completed in the Fall of 2013. 

On November 5, 2010 the Penn State Board of Trustees appointed Crawford Architects and Bohlin Cywinski Jackson as the architects for the new arena. Crawford Architects has worked on projects in the US and internationally and Bohlin Cywinski Jackson designed the Biobehavioral Health Building, currently under construction on the PSU campus.

It was announced on January 21, 2011 that the arena would be named in honor of Kim and Terry Pegula whose $88 million donation helped fund the arena and the creation of men's and women's varsity ice hockey programs.

On February 15, 2011, it was announced that the main lobby of the arena would be named after the Silvis family, following a $1 million donation by Paul and Nancy Silvis.

The arena opened on October 11, 2013 when the Penn State Nittany Lions men's ice hockey hosted Army.

Pegula Ice Arena is capable of hosting other on-ice events, including ice shows and National Hockey League and American Hockey League exhibition games. The first NHL exhibition game at the arena, featuring Pegula's Buffalo Sabres hosting the Minnesota Wild, took place in September 2016, seeing the Minnesota Wild score the game-winning goal with less than 5 seconds in regulation for a 2-1 win. The Sabres will return to the arena for a preseason game in 2017. The main ice arena features a main competition ice arena with seating for about 6,000 spectators. The facility also includes a practice rink, offices, locker rooms and player areas. The facility was 100% privately funded as part of the $88 million gift, the largest in the university's history, to advance the men's and women's ice hockey programs to the NCAA Division I level and provide a suitable facility for that move.

See also
 Penn State Nittany Lions men's ice hockey
 Penn State Nittany Lions women's ice hockey
 Penn State Nittany Lions

References

External links
Penn State Official Athletic Site - Pegula Ice Arena

Penn State Nittany Lions ice hockey
College ice hockey venues in the United States
2013 establishments in Pennsylvania
Sports venues completed in 2013
Indoor ice hockey venues in Pennsylvania
Pennsylvania State University campus